Zalivsky is a rural locality (a khutor) and the administrative center of Zalivskoye Rural Settlement, Oktyabrsky District, Volgograd Oblast, Russia. The population was 896 as of 2010. There are 14 streets.

Geography 
Zalivsky is located in steppe, on Yergeni, on the left bank of the Aksay Yesaulovsky River, 17 kilometers west of Oktyabrsky (the district's administrative centre) by road. Chikov is the nearest rural locality.

References 

Rural localities in Oktyabrsky District, Volgograd Oblast